Okuapeman School is a coeducational first-cycle institution in Akropong in the Eastern Region of Ghana.

History
The school was established in 1957 by barrister Charles Opoku Acheampong, who had been a pupil in the chambers of Edward Akufo-Addo.

Due to establishment in a traditional and royal area, Past Students earn the name Adehye. The school was started by Barrister Opoku Acheampong and was later handled to the government of Ghana after his demise. The school runs both day and boarding system with majority of the students in the boarding house. There are 8 houses in all with 4 for the ladies and 4 for the gentlemen. They are namely Opoku Acheampong House - Blue, Akuffo House - Green, Kwadade House - Yellow and Addo Dankwa House- Red.

The schools colors are brown and white with Brown signifying mother earth and nature and white depicting purity. The school has on this grounds trained a lot of diligent men and women in godliness, good character and responsible. There are lots of personalities like Kwami Sefa Kayi.

The school practices an inclusive system which enables visually impaired students have access to education. Visually Impaired students are given the opportunity to participate in activities and share facilities with the other students. The school strongly stand by its principle of not segregating students on any grounds. The school's disciplinary actions against students who condemn others with special needs are very swift.

Enrolment
The school has about 2,500 students, including special students. Special needs students are enrolled in the general arts class and are offered courses on languages (Twi, Ga, Ewe and French), History, Government, Literature and CRS. They are excluded from Mathematics and Science due to their inability to join in the practical session.

Facilities 

 Braille Library for Visually Impaired students
 3 Science Laboratories ( Physics, Biology and Chemistry)
 I.C.T Lab
 Library
 Home Economics Lab
 Visual Arts Center
 School Farm
 Sports (standard field for soccer and athletics, basketball court, volley and handball court)
 School Clinic
 Barbering shop

See also

 Education in Ghana
 List of senior high schools in Ghana

References

1957 establishments in Ghana
Education in the Eastern Region (Ghana)
Educational institutions established in 1957
High schools in Ghana